is a train station in the village of Chikuhoku, Higashichikuma District, Nagano Prefecture, Japan, operated by East Japan Railway Company (JR East).

Lines
Kamuriki Station is served by the Shinonoi Line and is 48.3 kilometers from the terminus of the line at Shiojiri Station.

Station layout
The station consists of two ground-level opposed side platforms serving a two tracks, connected to the station building by a footbridge. The station is a  Kan'i itaku station.

Platforms

History
Kamuriki Station opened on 1 April 1945. With the privatization of Japanese National Railways (JNR) on 1 April 1987, the station came under the control of JR East.

Passenger statistics
In fiscal 2015, the station was used by an average of 77 passengers daily (boarding passengers only).

Surrounding area
The station is located in a rural area, with no residences or buildings nearby.

See also
 List of railway stations in Japan

References

External links

 JR East station information 

Railway stations in Nagano Prefecture
Railway stations in Japan opened in 1945
Stations of East Japan Railway Company
Shinonoi Line
Chikuhoku, Nagano